Forsaken House is a 2004 fantasy novel by Richard Baker, set in the Dungeons & Dragons Forgotten Realms fictional universe. It is the first novel in the "Last Mythal" series.

Plot
Araevin Teshurr is an elven mage who spends time with a company of human and dwarven adventurers. Upon returning to the elves' secluded home of Evermeet, he becomes embroiled in a deadly attack perpetrated by a group of outcast demon-elves, freed from their 5,000-year imprisonment and seeking revenge. While searching for a trio of mysterious magical stones, Araevin must convince the elves to end their isolation from the rest of Faerun, and band together with the other races to prevent the demon army from overrunning the world.

Publication history
2004, USA, Wizards of the Coast , Pub date 1 August 2004, Paperback

Reception

References

2004 American novels

American fantasy novels
Forgotten Realms novels